East Ville was a railway station on the East Lincolnshire Railway which served the village of Eastville in Lincolnshire between 1848 and 1964. It originally opened as East Ville and New Leake, but was renamed in 1850. Withdrawal of passenger services took place in 1961, followed by goods facilities in 1964. The line through the station remains in use as the Poacher Line

History

The station was opened on 2 October 1848 as East Ville and New Leake after the nearby settlements of Eastville and Leake, and later renamed in 1852 to simply East Ville. This section was the last to be completed in September 1848 at an agreed cost of  £123,000. The station was situated in the middle of Eastville and was provided with two long sidings on the up side and a small goods yard, warehouse and long headshunt on the down side. To the north of parallel platforms was a signal box and level crossing, with the main station building located on the down platform. Goods traffic was always more important than passenger receipts and the goods yard handled large amounts of sugar beet in block loads, which were manually transferred to waiting wagons. The 1922 timetable saw five up and four down services, and one Sunday service each way. The station was closed to passengers on 11 September 1961 and to goods traffic on 15 June 1964.

Present day

References

Sources

 
 

Disused railway stations in Lincolnshire
Railway stations in Great Britain closed in 1964
Railway stations in Great Britain opened in 1848
Former Great Northern Railway stations